"Eon Break" is a song by American electronic music producer Porter Robinson, under the alias Virtual Self. It was released on October 25, 2017 as the first single from his debut EP under the alias, Virtual Self. Robinson wrote, produced, and performed the track. The song contains elements of Japanese video game music, specifically the musical dancing game Dance Dance Revolution.

An official music video was uploaded to Robinson's YouTube channel, and features abstract computer generated imagery accompanied by cryptic text referencing concepts like "angel", "virtual", and "void".

Background 
Robinson has stated in the past that he has been heavily influenced by the game series Dance Dance Revolution, as it initially gave him the inspiration to pursue music, producing under the alias Ekowraith. "Eon Break" is noticeably similar to much of the music found in these games, and games similar to it, clearly reflecting Robinson's influences.

The song is dissimilar to what Robinson has produced as of late, namely his melodic and nostalgia inspired debut album Worlds, and his 2016 single "Shelter", a collaboration with fellow electronic music producer Madeon, in both its release and composition. The song has cryptic questions and statements interwoven throughout various aspects of its release, including its Twitter account and Facebook page. Fans were quick to discover that messaging the Virtual Self Facebook page would display another cryptic message. Much speculation has arisen as to what "Virtual Self" is, as Robinson has yet to release any statements on the subject.

Composition 
The track is written in the key of A minor.

"Eon Break" begins with a laser-esque sound effect that emulates the song selection sound from beatmania IIDX (specifically 9th style). The sound is then followed by an electronic choir, which is then accompanied by a breathy female vocals and drums. As the song builds, a lead sound is introduced, reminiscent of many Eurodance lead sounds of the late 1990s and early 2000s. A piano with heavy reverb can be heard in the background further into the song, akin to the lead piano in Robinson's 2012 single "Language".

The song features a 180 BPM, half-time drum beat and bitcrushed sounds, not dissimilar from Robinson's earlier work. What sets it apart, however, are the sounds themselves, which take on a far more retro, early 2000s quality.

Release history

References

External links
 

2017 songs
2017 singles
Porter Robinson songs
Song recordings produced by Porter Robinson
Songs written by Porter Robinson